Happy Endings is an American television sitcom broadcast on ABC. Starring Eliza Coupe, Elisha Cuthbert, Zachary Knighton, Adam Pally, Damon Wayans, Jr., and Casey Wilson, the single-camera ensemble comedy revolves around the lives of a group of friends whose group is rocked when the couple that brought them together, Alex and Dave, break up. This leaves the rest of the group—Max, Brad, Jane, and Penny—in an awkward position of either trying to stay together as friends or having to choose sides.

The series ran on ABC from April 13, 2011, to May 3, 2013. Additionally, a series of six webisodes, titled Happy Rides and sponsored by Subaru, aired on ABC.com during the second season. A total of 57 episodes of Happy Endings aired across three seasons.

Series overview

Episodes

Season 1 (2011)

Season 2 (2011–12)

Season 3 (2012–13)

See also
 Happy Endings: Happy Rides

References

External links
 
 

Lists of American sitcom episodes

fr:Liste des épisodes de Happy Endings